Biliary microlithiasis refers to the creation of small gallstones less than 3 mm in diameter in the biliary duct or gallbladder.

It has been suggested as a cause of postcholecystectomy syndrome, or PCS, the symptoms of which include:

 Upset stomach, nausea, and vomiting. 
 Gas, bloating, and diarrhea.
 Persistent pain in the upper right abdomen.

Diagnostics

 Biliary Microlithiasis may be detectable by ultrasound using a Rapid Patient Rotation Ultrasound Protocol
 Analysis of biliary sludge obtained through endoscopic retrograde cholangiopancreatography (ERCP)

Treatment

 Oral ursodeoxycholic acid can be used to dissolve these crystals.

See also
Biliary sludge

References

Medical terminology
Disorders of gallbladder, biliary tract and pancreas